Anderston railway station serves Glasgow's financial district of Anderston and, across the M8 motorway, the housing schemes of both Anderston West and the Blythswood Court estate of the Anderston Centre. It is also close to both the Hilton and Marriott hotels. It is a staffed station with an island platform and most of it is underground.

History 
The station was opened on 10 August 1896 by the Glasgow Central Railway which was subsequently absorbed by the Caledonian Railway. It later became part of the London, Midland and Scottish Railway during the Grouping of 1923. The station then passed on to the Scottish Region of British Railways on nationalisation in 1948. It was then closed by the British Transport Commission on 3 August 1959.

The original building was demolished in 1968 as, like many other ornate and historical buildings in the area, it lay in the path of the M8 motorway. The station was reopened as part of the Argyle Line project on 5 November 1979 by the British Railways Board and Strathclyde PTE and retains some of the original architecture at platform level.

When sectorisation was introduced in the 1980s, the station was served by ScotRail under arrangement with the PTE until the privatisation of British Rail in the 1990s.

Ticket barriers came into operation on 22 June 2011.

In 2022, the station was extensively refurbished with new finishes on the concourse and platforms, a remodelled booking office and a new lift.

Gallery

Services 

Mondays to Saturdays:

 2tph to Dalmuir via Yoker
 2tph to Dalmuir via Singer
 2tph to Milngavie via Westerton
 2tph to Whifflet, with an hourly extension to Motherwell
 2tph to Larkhall via Hamilton
 1tph to Motherwell via Hamilton
 1tph to Cumbernauld via Hamilton and Motherwell

Sundays (10.00 - 18:00 only)

 2tph to  via Yoker
 2tph to Milngavie
 1tph to Larkhall
 1tph to Motherwell via Whifflet
 2tph to Motherwell via Hamilton

Some weekday peak services to/from the south also start or terminate here.

References

Notes

Sources

External links

 Video footage of Anderston station

Railway stations in Glasgow
Former Caledonian Railway stations
Railway stations in Great Britain opened in 1896
Railway stations in Great Britain closed in 1959
Railway stations in Great Britain opened in 1979
Reopened railway stations in Great Britain
SPT railway stations
Railway stations served by ScotRail